Bruce E. Mowday is an author who lives in Chester County, Pennsylvania. He specializes in books about local history, business, sports, and true crime. He is active with the Chester County Historical Society.

Professional life 

Mowday began working as a sportswriter for the Coatesville Record while still in high school. He continued his journalism career at The Daily Local News in West Chester, Pennsylvania, working as a courthouse reporter and rising to become managing editor. He also worked at the St. Louis Sun. While at the Daily Local, he covered the trials that form the basis of his book Jailing the Johnston Gang; the book was later cited by the Johnston brothers in an unsuccessful appeal for a new trial.

Mowday left journalism in 1997 to start the Mowday Group, a media relations and consulting company. His clients include local political groups and candidates, businesses, nonprofits, and artists. He also is a speaker on historical topics and actively markets his books.

Mowday co-founded the  Brandywine Valley Writers Group in 2004 with writers Therese Boyd and Carla Westerman. He has been a guest speaker on the subject of writing and publishing, for both that group and the Main Line Writers Group in King of Prussia, Pennsylvania.

Mowday has appeared on C-SPAN, Discovery ID, ReelZ, Pennsylvania Cable Network, and local Philadelphia television stations in connection with his books.

Personal life 

Mowday lives in Downingtown, Chester County, Pennsylvania. He has two grown daughters and three grandsons.

Books
Mowday has published several books:
J. Howard Wert's Gettysburg (Schiffer Publishing)
Selling Your Book (Barricade Books)
Pickett's Charge: The Untold Story (Barricade Books)
Life With Flavor: A Personal History of Herr's (Barricade Books)
Richie Ashburn: Why The Hall Not? and the Amazing Journey to Cooperstown (Barricade Books)
Jailing the Johnston Gang: Bringing Serial Murderers to Justice (Barricade Books); 
Unlikely Allies: Fort Delaware's Prison Community in the Civil War (Stackpole Books)
September 11, 1777: Washington's Defeat at Brandywine Dooms Philadelphia (White Mane Publishers)
Selling of an Author (White Mane Publishers)
West Chester: Six Walking Tours (Schiffer Publishing)
"Spanning the Centuries" (a history of Caln Township, Chester County, written with his daughter Melissa Mowday)

He has also compiled six books of historical postcards and photographs, published by Arcadia Publishing:
Along the Brandywine River
Chester County Mushroom Farming
West Chester
Downingtown
Coatesville
Parkesburg

References

External links 
 The Mowday Group

Living people
American male writers
Year of birth missing (living people)